Pall-mall, paille-maille, palle-maille, pell-mell, or palle-malle is a lawn game (though mostly played on earth surfaces rather than grass) that was mostly played in the 16th and 17th centuries. It is considered a precursor to croquet.

History

The name comes from the Italian , which literally means 'ball mallet', ultimately derived from Latin , meaning 'ball', and  meaning 'maul, hammer, or mallet'. An alternative etymology has been suggested, from Middle French  or 'straw-mallet', in reference to target hoops being made of bound straw.

History in Britain
It appears that pall mall was introduced from France into Scotland and later to England. The 19th-century historian Henry B. Wheatley states that "pall mall was a popular game in the sixteenth and seventeenth centuries and few large towns were without a mall, or prepared ground, where it could be played; but it has now been so long out of use that no satisfactory account of the game can be found."

Mary, Queen of Scots, reportedly played pall mall at Seton Palace in East Lothian shortly after the murder of David Rizzio in the spring of 1566. King James VI in his 1599 Basilikon Doron mentions "palle maillé" among the "faire and pleasant field-games" suitable for his son Prince Henry.

The author Henry B. Wheatley speculated that the game was introduced to England from Scotland after the accession of James VI in 1603, quoting a statement from Robert Dallington's Method for Travell, that the game had not yet reached England. In the Method for Travell, which Wheatley dated to 1598 but may have been as late as 1605, Dallington marvels that pall-mall was one of the few French pastimes that had not been introduced to England.

The French ambassador Antoine Lefèvre de la Boderie said that Prince Henry (in England) in 1606 played golf, which he compared to "pallemail". One of Prince Henry's biographers, in a work published in 1634, mentioned that he played "gauffe (a play not unlike to Palemaille)". Prince Henry had a court or pitch, a "pell mell", laid out at St James' Fields, north of St James's Palace. It was surfaced with cockle shells crushed into clay or loam.

It is known that sometime around 1630 a Frenchman named John Bonnealle laid out a court for playing pall-mall on the south side of St. James's Square, London, in an area known as St. James's Field (later Pall Mall Field). "A year or two" later, in about 1631, Bonnealle had died and the king's shoemaker, David Mallard or Mallock, had built a house on this land, which he was ordered to demolish by Candlemas Day (around 2 February) 1632.

Evidently, the pall-mall court was rebuilt at this site, as Archibald Lumsden received a grant on 30 September 1635 "for sole furnishing of all the 'Malls,' bowls, scoops, and other necessaries for the game of Pall Mall within his grounds in St. James's Fields, and that such as resort there shall pay him such sums of money as are according to the ancient order of the game."

Lumsden's pall-mall court also appears in the records in September 1660, when his daughter Isabella petitioned for "one of the tenements in St. James's Field, as promised to her father who spent £425 14s in keeping the sport of Pall Mall". Accounts attached to the petition appeared to indicate the money was spent on "bowls, malls and scopes, 1632 to 1635, and in repairs in Pall Mall, when the Queen went thither to lie in of the Lady Mary."

Samuel Pepys's diary for 2 April 1661 records that he went "into St. James's Park, where I saw the Duke of York playing at Pelemele, the first time that I ever saw the sport".

There do not appear to be references earlier than 1630 to the game being played in England. The game is mentioned in a 1611 French–English dictionary, but this does not demonstrate that it was actually played in England at that time:

Cotgrave's description of the long alley-like playing surface with an iron hoop at either end accords well with reports of the game as played in London twenty years later. However, there's little reason to read this as an implication that the game was played in England in 1611, especially given that he is providing an English definition of a French word.

An early 19th-century writer on English games, Joseph Strutt, quotes Cotgrave's description and the association with Restoration royalty:

The game was still known in the early nineteenth century, as is proved by its reference in many English dictionaries. In Samuel Johnson's 1828 dictionary, his definition of "Pall mall" clearly describes a game with similarities to modern croquet: "A play in which the ball is struck with a mallet through an iron ring".  In his unpublished memoir the writer Oswell Blakeston reports seeing it played at "the only pub that still has a green for this game" in the late 1930s.

Game play
It was played in a long alley with an iron hoop suspended over the ground at the end. The object was to strike a boxwood ball of unknown circumference (a modern croquet ball is normally  in diameter, which equates to approx , in circumference) with a heavy wooden mallet, down the alley and through the hoop with the fewest hits possible. However, it is known that this is not correct, as a ball of that size would be far, far too heavy to lift to a high height with a small mallet. Note the ball in the engraving. It differed from trucco especially in its more extreme length of playing area, suggesting a closer relationship to golf than other derivatives of ground billiards.

Pall-mall was popular in Italy, France and Scotland, and spread to England and other parts of Western Europe in the 16th century. The name refers not only to the game, but also to the mallet used and the alley in which it was played. Many cities still have long straight roads or promenades which evolved from the alleys in which the game was played. Such in London are Pall Mall and the Mall, in Hamburg the Palmaille, in Paris the Rue du Mail, the Avenue du Mail in Geneva, and in Utrecht the Maliebaan. When the game fell out of fashion, some of these "pall malls" evolved into shopping areas, hence the modern name of shopping centres in North America—shopping malls—while others evolved into grassed, shady promenades, still called malls today.

In popular culture 

 Pall-mall features heavily in Julia Quinn's Regency romance novel The Viscount Who Loved Me and its subsequent second epilogue.
 The second season of the Netflix series Bridgerton, based on Quinn's novel, prominently features a game of pall-mall as an annual tradition for the siblings of the eponymous family. Because of the series' popularity, department store John Lewis reported a 90% spike in the sales of croquet sets, the modern equivalent of pall-mall.

References

Sources

, available at 

Ground billiards

es:Mallo (juego)
fr:Jeu de mail
io:Malio
it:Pallamaglio
mk:Пал мал (игра)
nl:Malie (spel)
no:Paille-maille